Ahmed Farhan Mushref Al-Ghalami (born 1 January 1999) is an Iraqi professional footballer who plays as a midfielder for Al-Shorta and the Iraq national team.

Club career
Ahmed broke into the Al-Mina'a first team in 2017 and remained at the club until 2020, scoring three goals before moving to city rivals Naft Al-Basra, where he scored nine goals in his first season at the club.

International career
Farhan was called up to the Iraq national team for the first time for the 2021 FIFA Arab Cup. He started both of Iraq's opening matches against Oman and Bahrain before an injury kept him on the bench for Iraq's final match against Qatar.

References

Living people
1999 births
Iraqi footballers
Al-Mina'a SC players
Al-Shorta SC players
Association football midfielders